When Do You Commit Suicide? (French:Quand te tues-tu?) is a 1953 French comedy film directed by Émile Couzinet and starring Jean Tissier, Frédéric Duvallès and Daniel Sorano. It is a remake of the 1931 film of the same title.

Cast
 Jean Tissier as Vicomte Xavier du Venoux  
 Frédéric Duvallès as Gripasou  
 Daniel Sorano as Midol  
 Jeanne Fusier-Gir as Virginie  
 Arlette Sauvage as Gaby  
 René Génin as Le maire  
 Gaby Bruyère 
 Léonce Corne as Le notaire 
 Carmen Amaya as Herself  
 Georges Coulonges
 Maurice Lambert
 Marcel Roche as Duradin  
 Marcel Vallée as Petavey

References

Bibliography 
 Goble, Alan. The Complete Index to Literary Sources in Film. Walter de Gruyter, 1999.

External links 
 

1953 films
French comedy films
1953 comedy films
1950s French-language films
Films directed by Émile Couzinet
French remakes of American films
French black-and-white films
1950s French films